Sphenodesme is a genus of plants in the family Lamiaceae, first described in 1820. The genus is native to southern China, the Indian Subcontinent, Indo-China and Malesia.

Species
The following are listed in the Kew World Checklist:
 Sphenodesme amethystina Dop - Vietnam
 Sphenodesme eryciboides Kurz - Myanmar, Thailand
 Sphenodesme ferruginea (Griff.) Briq.  - Laos, Vietnam, Myanmar, Thailand
 Sphenodesme floribunda Chun & F.C.How - Guangdong, Hainan
 Sphenodesme griffithiana Wight - Vietnam, Myanmar
 Sphenodesme involucrata (C.Presl) B.L.Rob - India, Assam, Andaman & Nicobar Islands, Myanmar, Vietnam, Thailand, Malaya, Borneo, Guangdong, Hainan, Taiwan 
 Sphenodesme mekongensis Dop - Laos, Thailand
 Sphenodesme mollis Craib - Yunnan, Cambodia, Thailand, Vietnam
 Sphenodesme pentandra Jack - Sri Lanka, Bangladesh, Assam, Nicobar Islands, Indochina, Malaya, Borneo, Guangdong, Hainan, Yunnan 
 Sphenodesme pierrei Dop - Vietnam
 Sphenodesme racemosa (C.Presl) Moldenke - Malaya, Borneo, Sumatra
 Sphenodesme sarawakensis Moldenke - Borneo
 Sphenodesme stellata Merr. - Sabah
 Sphenodesme thorelii Dop - Vietnam
 Sphenodesme triflora Wight - Thailand, Malaya, Borneo, Sumatra

References

External links

Lamiaceae
Lamiaceae genera
Lamiales of Asia